Barnton is a suburb of Edinburgh, Scotland, in the north-west of the city, between Cramond and Corstorphine Hill and west of Davidsons Mains. Part of the area was traditionally known as "Cramond Muir" in reference to Cramond to the north.

Notable buildings
It is home to the Royal High School of Edinburgh designed by Reid and Forbes in 1964. Braehead House, a complex house centred on a 15th-century remodelled Scottish tower house hides amongst modern housing. The Royal Burgess Golfing Society, one of the oldest golf societies in the world with a clubhouse dating from 1896. Cargilfield Preparatory School lies to the north.

The most notable landmark is the former Barnton Hotel at the junction of Whitehouse Loan and Queensferry Road which dates from 1895 and was converted to flats in 2016.

The White House (which gives its name to Whitehouse Road) dates from 1615. It was extended and remodelled by MacGibbon and Ross in 1895.

The area centres on the paired streets of Barnton Avenue and West Barnton Avenue. These stand on the former estate of Barnton House (formerly Cramond Regis). All that remains is the ornate west gate pillars, designed by David Hamilton in 1810, on Whitehouse Loan at the west end of West Barnton Avenue. Both halves of the avenue possess a series of large villas dating from the early 20th century. The west avenue in particular has several modern blocks of flats.

Notable areas

Barnton Quarry, a former stone quarry in the area, is the (now derelict) site of an underground bunker which, in the event of nuclear war, would have served as the regional seat of government for Scotland from 1961 until its abandonment in 1985.

Barnton Park Lawn Tennis Club is (Barnton Park LTC) situated on East Barnton Gardens.

Bruntsfield Golf Course is situated off Barnton Avenue, accessible via Davidson's Mains.

The Royal Burgess Golf Club, the oldest golfing society in the world, is within the boundaries on Whitehouse Road.

The boundaries follow local large roads particularly along Queensferry road until the Barnton Hotel. The north/west boundary follows Whitehouse until the t-junction at Gameskeeper's road. The north-east boundary follows Gameskeeper road and Cramond Road South until it meets Queensferry road in Davidson's Mains.

There are two schools within the boundaries. The Royal High School, a state comprehensive secondary school, and Cargilfield Preparatory School, an independent preparatory school.

Notable residents
 Robert Barton of Over Barnton
 Alexander Carmichael, compiler of Carmina Gadelica
 Col John James McIntosh Shaw, military surgeon and pioneer of plastic surgery
 Thea Musgrave, composer, was born in Barnton
 J. K. Rowling
 Robert Blyth Greig lived on Barnton Avenue West
 William Ramsay (MP)
 Tom Farmer

References

Areas of Edinburgh